Pursuit of Honor is a novel by Vince Flynn and the tenth novel in the Mitch Rapp series. It was published on December 1, 2009.

Synopsis
The book opens days after Muslim extremists have blown up a power lunch restaurant filled with members of Congress and staffers. After that, a second squad attacks the National Counter Terrorist Center killing dozens more until Mitch Rapp and his partner Mike Nash send the bad guys off to paradise. With nearly 200 dead, the nation is in no mood to negotiate with the Islamic extremists. The President has given Rapp a green light to be the judge, jury and executioner. The sharp edge of the CIA's sword has been let loose with few strings attached. The story takes place over the following week.

Rapp is on the trail of a liberal lawyer inspector general of the CIA who has been giving out information that some consider to aid the enemy. Meanwhile, three of the cell that helped carry out the DC attack are hiding out in rural Iowa, waiting for the heat to die down. Hakim is the mastermind who knows about the US after living here for a long time while Karim is the hotheaded soldier who wants a legacy as The Lion of al Qaeda. One day, a dad and son walk up to their farmhouse asking for permission to hunt nearby. Hakim gave them his permission because he knows that's all they want, but Karim is convinced they are undercover police and kills them both. Now they are on the run, trying to stay a step ahead of the police. Neither trusts the other and they ended up splitting. Hakim to Nassau to get money and hide somewhere while Karim and Ahmed, their loyal servant went to Washington to wreak more havoc.

After the President award a medal to Nash (set up by Mitch for Nash to give Nash a better life), Karim kidnapped Nash's daughter while Nash and his wife have dinner in a restaurant. Karim and Ahmed brought Nash's daughter to the Lincoln Memorial and decided to make a deal with Nash. At the exchange point, Mitch successfully killed Karim.

Novels by Vince Flynn
2009 American novels
Atria Publishing Group books